Pre-mRNA-splicing factor SLU7 is a protein that in humans is encoded by the SLU7 gene.

Pre-mRNA splicing occurs in two sequential transesterification steps. The protein encoded by this gene is a splicing factor that has been found to be essential during the second catalytic step in the pre-mRNA splicing process. It associates with the spliceosome and contains a zinc knuckle motif that is found in other splicing factors and is involved in protein-nucleic acid and protein-protein interactions.

References

Further reading